Ed Glenn may refer to:

 Ed Glenn (shortstop) (1875–1911), professional baseball shortstop
 Ed Glenn (outfielder) (1860–1892), professional baseball outfielder

See also
 Edward Glen (born 1953), Canadian voice actor